The Volvo S60 series is a compact executive car manufactured and marketed by Volvo since 2000.

The first generation (2000–2009) was launched in autumn of 2000 in order to replace the S70 and was based on the P2 platform. It had a similar designed estate version called Volvo V70 and a high performance engine and sports-oriented suspension version called S60 R. Styling cues were taken from the ECC concept car and the S80.

The second generation (2010–2018) was released in 2010 for the 2011 model year and has its own estate version, known as the Volvo V60.

The third generation joined the Volvo line-up in 2018 for the 2019 model year. It is built on a shortened version of the Scalable Product Architecture platform, in America's first Volvo factory in Ridgeville, South Carolina. The US became the sole global source of the S60 sedan after production in China was phased out in early 2019.

First generation (2000–2009)

The S60 was built on Volvo's P2 platform, which was shared with other Volvo models like the S80, V70, XC70 and finally the XC90.

The Volvo S60 was released in 2000 (2001 model year) being the company's new generation sports sedan. The S60 is aimed to mainly compete in Europe with the BMW 3 Series (E46), the Mercedes-Benz C-Class (W203) and the Alfa Romeo 156. Unlike its rivals, the Volvo S60 continued production for 9 years with multiple facelifts. When it was introduced the appearance was unlike the squared vehicles offered in previous years, and continued the new design tradition introduced by the larger S80, utilizing a cab forward approach and was more organic appearing with a pronounced shelf along the beltline that ran the length of the vehicle, achieving a  drag coefficient. Volvo continued its safety tradition, offering front and rear integrated crumple zones, driver and front passenger dual threshold airbags with a collapsible three-stage steering column, Side Impact Protection System (SIPS) supplemented with air bags for driver and front passenger, along with a side curtain airbag for front and rear passengers, anti-submarine seats, five padded head restraints with Whiplash Protection System (WHIPS), and automatic seat belt pretensioners while front belts also have height adjustment. 

In 2004 PremAir™ was introduced as a standard feature to the exterior radiator surface which converts up to 75 percent of ground level ozone in the radiator cooling air into oxygen, while the Interior Air Quality System cleans the air inside, detects for pollutants and automatically recirculates in comparison to the air outside. The upholstery was available in taupe, light sand or graphite with indigo inserts and the leathers were tanned using natural plant materials. The S60 sheet metal content can be recycled, along with other metals that achieved an 85 overall percentage. Dual zone climate control and heated front seats along with a three position drivers memory setting were optional, and anti-smash and grab laminated side windows were available. Two , three  and one  aluminum alloy wheel choices were available.

The S60 came standard with Volvo's own radio unit, the HU-613, the HU-803 and was later upgraded to the HU-650 and an optional extra HU-850 unit. The HU-850 unit features a 225 or 335-watt power output (depending on optional external amplifier) with three presets: 2CH, 3CH and Dolby Digital Pro Logic II Surround Sound. The Four-C chassis from the S60 R became an option on some S60s. 

The Haldex-sourced computer controlled AWD system, which was standard equipment in the S60R, was optionally available mated to the 2.5 liter engine. Three  transmissions were offered, the Geartronic automatic which offered five speeds that adapts to driving style or the "Auto-Stick" offers a manual mode that offered the ability to select gears by moving the gearstick forward or back. The second automatic five speed transmission was available without the manual mode feature. A more traditional manual five speed transmission was the third selection offered.

The S60 was refreshed in 2005. The exterior was updated with body-colored side moldings and bumpers with chrome linings, as well as new headlamps replacing the original with black housing, with optional HID headlights. The interior received some updates as well, with new seats, trim, and an updated center console. The S60 went through a final facelift in 2008 with full body-colored bumper and door inserts and larger emblem in the front and larger spaced out "V-O-L-V-O" letters in the rear. The interior featured a new pattern upholstery which differs from its original pattern.

First generation models

S60 Police specification (UK & EU)
Police specification models came about through Volvo's extensive work alongside the users of the vehicles and Police Fleet Management departments. As a result, the Police specification vehicles have a striking difference from original showroom model that sometimes the Volvo S60 is used as police cars.
Firstly the suspension was up-rated to deal with the demands of Police work; this included fitting the front suspension of the D5 model variant (as the suspension was designed to deal with the heavier diesel engine). Nivomat self-levelling suspension was also fitted to the rear to ensure correct geometry of the vehicle, regardless of the weight carried. On early models, the clutch was also replaced with the stronger D5 unit.

A larger specification battery and 110A alternator was also fitted to run all the extra equipment, along with a dedicated Police fuse box in the boot. Extra wiring looms are also fitted specially for the Police radios and other equipment, including CCTV cameras. Additional electrical noise suppression has been added so as not to interfere with the sensitive electronics the police use.

The speedometers in the vehicles are calibrated from the factory and do not require recalibration unless the wheel and overall rolling diameters are changed.

 vented front disc brakes were also fitted alongside special brake pads (and wear indicators) specially designed to cope with high-speed pursuits.

During 2001–2004 the 2.3 litre T5 engine was used and in 2005-2009 the 2.4 litre T5 engine was used. Also beyond common speculation and myths, the engines are not chipped or modified specially for police use: they are complete factory spec but in 'exceptional cases' the speed limiter may have been removed.

S60 R
First introduced in 2004, Volvo's S60 R used a Haldex computer controlled all-wheel-drive system mated to a  /  inline-5 which sends 95 percent of the torque to the front wheels under normal driving conditions and can send up to 70 percent to the rear wheels as necessary. The 2004–2005 models came with a 6-speed manual transmission, or an available 5-speed automatic which allowed only  torque in 1st and 2nd gears. The 2006–2007 models came with a 6-speed manual or 6-speed automatic transmission (which was no longer torque-restricted).

Other aspects which set the R apart from standard S60s were the large Brembo front and rear four-piston brakes, 18-inch 5-spoke "Pegasus" wheels (available as an upgrade to the standard 17-inch wheels of the same design), blue faced "R" gauges, standard HID headlights, as well as the Four-C suspension system.

Semi-active suspension with Four-C (a short name for "Continuously Controlled Chassis Concept") allows the user to select from three modes: Comfort, Sport, and Advanced. "Comfort" attempts to soften the car over bumps, while "Advanced" firms the suspension considerably and gives more aggressive throttle response - a setting Volvo implies is for use on the race track. This is accomplished through a drive by wire throttle, allowing the same pedal travel to result in different performance when the appropriate mode is selected, electronically controlled shock absorbers that can adjust themselves 500 times a second, and a complex series of sensors throughout the body of the vehicle. Volvo collaborated with high-tech system developer Ohlins Racing AB and shock absorber manufacturer Monroe for the self-adjusting shock absorbers.

The R had three themed interior color options with upholstery in soft leather supplied by Bridge of Weir, and they were Nordkapp (dark blue) or Gobi (light tan). A third choice was offered as a natural leather option, Atacama (dark orange), available for an additional charge. The natural leather choice was sumptuous with a baseball glove thickness and feel.

The small trunk lid spoiler that was standard on the S60 R created a 20% increased downforce at the rear wheels at high speeds compared to the standard S60s. The S60 Rs have a 0.29 Drag coefficient, compared to the standard S60's 0.28, due to the larger lower front bumper spoiler to support the secondary intercooler.

Another Volvo factory option for only the S60 R was a body kit which included front bumper splitters, side skirts and a rear valance, color matched to the body. The body kit was only available with certain body colors and in certain markets.

The S60 R continued the tradition of "R" cars for Volvo beginning in 1995 with the introduction of the 850 T-5 R.

Engines

Second generation (2010–2018)

The second generation S60 began production in Ghent, Belgium on May 17, 2010, with an expected annual production of 90,000 vehicles. Official photos were released in November 2009, and the car was publicly unveiled at the Geneva Motor Show in March 2010. It debuted as a 2011 model in North America. The second generation S60 also arrived with the 5th generation Haldex AWD system. More differences in the second generation S60 include the new large Volvo iron symbol, parallel to the grille LED day running lamps and larger spaced letters in the brand name on rear.

The engine range of the S60 and V60 comprises four petrol engines and three diesels. The engines available are the T3, T4, T5 and T6 petrol engines and D3, D5 and 1.6D DRIVe diesel engines, the latter of which has Stop Start Technology to increase the efficiency of the engine. The 2.4-litre D5 plug-in hybrid version, fitted with a five-cylinder diesel engine and a 50 kW electric motor, was scheduled for sale in Europe by November 2012.

The Volvo S60 and V60 come with Volvo's City Safety system as standard, which is the same system fitted to its sister the XC60. This system stops the car in the event of impending collision in 'City Traffic' below . Also, a new safety feature named "Pedestrian Detection" (available on both the V60 and S60) detects people in front of the car and automatically applies the brakes if the driver does not react in time. The new sedan shows off Volvo's completely new design language already seen in the Volvo XC60 concept. It rides on the same platform as the XC60. The goal of this new design was to target younger demographics.

2013 T5 engine update
In 2013, the T5 engine was revamped before the launch of the Drive-E arrival. Among the tweaks to the T5 power plant is a boost in engine compression to 9.5:1 from 9.0, engine torque peaks at 4200 rpm and engine management changes provide faster gear changes and upshifts when the 6-speed automatic gearbox is in the sport mode. The changes in compression ratio helps the S60 T5 deliver  extra in the city and combined cycle. Volvo also says the T5 AWD is good for a  sprint of 6.6 seconds, while the front-drive version is 0.2 seconds quicker.

2014 model year update
Changes include all-new exterior panels from the A-pillars forward including a new hood, front fenders and fascia; a wider grille with a larger Ironmark is flanked by new headlights while a larger, wider lower front intake gains bright accents and horizontally mounted LED daytime running lights; new integrated exhaust pipes at rear, a new Adaptive Digital TFT Display instrument cluster for select models (R-Design versions include unique blue instrument dials), new paddle shifters on T6 AWD and R-Design models (optional on T5), Advanced Quick Shift (AQS) option on all T6 engines and activated when the transmission is set to sport mode or when using paddle shifters, IntelliSafe with Pedestrian Detection and Cyclist Detection with full auto brake and Cross Traffic Alert became part of the Technology Package, a new radar-based Blind Spot Information System (BLIS) to monitor and alert the driver to rapidly approaching vehicles behind the car while still informing the driver about vehicles in the blind spots on both sides of the car, Cross Traffic Alert with radar sensors at the rear end of the car to alert the driver to crossing traffic from the sides when reversing out of a parking space.

North America models went on sale as 2014 model year vehicles in late 2013. Early models include S60 T5 (base, Premier, Premier Plus, Platinum), T6 (AWD, Premier Plus, Platinum, R-Design AWD, RD Platinum).

Second generation models

S60L
The S60L, also marketed as S60 Inscription, is the top-of-the-line, long wheelbase model of the S60. It has been lengthened by  compared to the standard model to give additional legroom for rear passengers. It is also manufactured in Chengdu, China, and is the first consumer automobile manufactured in China to be sold in the United States. The S60L commenced production in October 2014.

S60L PHEV
The Volvo S60L PPHEV (Petrol Plug-in Hybrid Electric Vehicle) concept car was unveiled at the 2014 Beijing International Automotive Exhibition. Volvo Cars announced that the S60L PPHEV will be manufactured at the Chengdu plant and is scheduled to be launched in China in the first half of 2015.

The S60L PPHEV shares the same electric-drive technology as the Volvo V60 Plug-in Hybrid, but instead of the diesel engine of the V60, the S60L PPHEV has a 2-liter, four-cylinder gasoline turbocharged engine from Volvo Cars’ new Drive-E engine family. The petrol-powered engine produces  and 350 N·m (258 lb-ft) of torque. The driver can select via three buttons among three driving modes: Pure, Hybrid or Power. By selecting Pure mode, the car runs in all-electric mode, and the Power mode combines the capabilities of the engine and motor to deliver , 550 N·m (405 lb-ft) of torque and 0–100 km/h (62 mph) acceleration in 5.5 seconds.

Volvo unveiled the production model, the S60L T6 Twin Engine PHEV, at the 2015 Shanghai Motor Show. Sales of the S60L T6 PHEV, limited to the Chinese market, began on 22 April 2015.

S60 Cross Country
A new limited production model known as the S60 Cross Country saw a limited American release in the autumn of 2015 (as it was for the 2015 model year in Europe), with each dealership only getting one car. This variant is similar to the Volvo V60 Cross Country, as it is a raised sedan variant of the S60. Limited to about 500 units from 2016 to 2017.

Concepts and special editions

Volvo S60 Polestar performance concept (2012)

The vehicle was unveiled at the Gothenburg CityArena.

2013
The 2013 Volvo S60 Polestar is a limited (50 units) version of the Volvo S60 T6 AWD for the Australian market. It includes a new BorgWarner turbo, new intercooler, a  stainless full-flow exhaust system with  tail pipes, Polestar Öhlins 2-way adjustable shock absorbers, upgraded springs (60N/mm front, 65N/mm rear. (80% stiffer than stock)), upgraded stabilizers in the front and rear, upgraded rear tie blades, upgraded top mount in the front and rear, upgraded toe link arms in the rear, strut brace with carbon fibre reinforcement, Michelin Pilot Super Sport 235/40R19 tires, 8x19-inch ET51 bespoke Polestar rims, Polestar-tuned AWF21 six-speed automatic gearbox with a launch control system, a Polestar-tuned Haldex 4WD system, modified transmission software for faster shifts and launch control, modified AWD software for more rear torque, front 336x29 mm ventilated brake discs with Jurid 958 performance brake pads, rear 302x22 mm ventilated brake discs with HP2000 Brembo performance brake pads, new Polestar front splitter corners, new Polestar rear spoiler, new Polestar diffuser, Polestar door trims, Polestar badging on the front grille, boot and engine cover, Polestar shift knob, Polestar limited edition plate on the door sills and steering wheel and black outside mirror covers. Delivery began in June 2013.

2014
The 2014 S60 Polestar was offered in Canada, the Netherlands, Japan, Sweden, Switzerland, United Kingdom and the United States. Based on the S60 Polestar Concept car and the Australian S60 Polestar, it includes a Polestar Öhlins shock absorber system, Polestar 8×20-inch ET53 bespoke rims with 245/35R20 tyres, a new twin-scroll BorgWarner turbo with new intercooler,  stainless full-flow exhaust system with  tail pipes, AWF21 automatic gearbox with paddle shift system, Polestar transmission calibration for faster gearshifts, launch control and curve-hold functionality; Polestar Haldex calibration for more rear torque dynamic distribution, Polestar calibrated stability control system, front  ventilated and floating brake discs with Polestar/Brembo 6 piston brake calipers, rear  ventilated brake disc. Delivery was set to begin in June 2014 to the local markets.

2015
This is developed by way of massaged engine management software, a stainless exhaust with  pipes, new twin-scroll BorgWarner turbochargers and new intercooler. Polestar also did work to the transmission with new calibration for quicker gearshifts and launch control capabilities. The Haldex four-wheel-drive system also has Polestar tuning for more rear torque distribution, and the stability control system has been massaged. The chassis is firmer with a suspension that features Öhlins shock absorbers with 80 percent stiffer springs sitting on 20-inch wheels that would normally come wrapped with Michelin Pilot Super Sport tires from the factory. Brakes get a nice upgrade with  front discs (replacing  ones on the R-Design) with six-piston Brembo calipers and -inch rear discs. Visual changes include new front and rear splitters, rear spoiler and diffuser. Inside there's a thick-rimmed steering wheel and upgraded seats with suede inserts, suede door inserts and blue accent stitching throughout.

Engines

Safety

Euro NCAP
Euro NCAP V60:
 Overall = 
 Adult occupant = 94%
 Child occupant = 82%
 Pedestrian = 64%

Insurance Institute for Highway Safety (IIHS)

1 vehicle structure rated "Good"
2 strength-to-weight ratio: 4.95

NHTSA

Third generation (2019–present)

Other than the Polestar model, T6 Momentum model and the T6 R-Design all other S60 models can be purchased or leased in the traditional way. Polestar models will be offered solely through its Care by Volvo monthly subscription plan. The 2019 model went on sale in October 2018.

Production
Production began in September 2018 in Ridgeville, South Carolina. The third generation of the Volvo S60 is the first Volvo manufactured in the United States. A  plant builds over 60,000 vehicles per year for both American and export markets. Capacity can go up to 100,000 vehicles per year if demand calls for it. The facility is Volvo's seventh, joining two European, three Chinese, and one Malaysian location. As of 2022, the plant employs nearly 1,500 people.

Trim levels
The S60 is available in Core, Plus, Ultimate, and Polestar trim levels depending on the sales market.

Engines
The S60 comes with two engine options: the T5, which features a turbocharged mild hybrid 2.0-liter four-cylinder sending  to the front wheels (or all four wheels in some markets as an option) and the T8, a performance-oriented plug-in hybrid which combines a turbocharged and supercharged four-cylinder and an electric motor at the rear, sending a combined  to all four wheels. In 2022, the T8 hybrid engine was updated by removing its supercharger, which with its electrical engine, produces max  combined and  torque.

Safety
Standard gear on all S60s includes an improved City Safety collision avoidance system based on Volvo's Vision 2020. The system can now help the driver do an evasive maneuver and can detect and mitigate oncoming vehicles at intersections. An optional Pilot Assist system is equipped into the model.

Gallery

British land speed record
A joint project by Volvo and Prodrive and covered by Channel 4's Driven and Car magazine.

The car was standard except for safety modifications such as a roll cage, exterior cut out switch, a modified fuel tank and additional head support to allow the drivers (BTCC drivers Anthony Reid, Rickard Rydell, John Cleland and Alain Menu as well as various Car journalists and Channel 4's Mike Brewer) to rest their neck during the 2-hour gaps between pit stops. Each pitstop included a driver change, refuel and tyre changes due to the extreme stresses being placed on the front outside tyre.

The following records were broken:

 50 mile standing start: 148.59 mph
 100 mile standing start: 147.00 mph
 200 mile standing start: 144.05 mph
 500 mile standing start: 141.53 mph
 1000 miles standing start: 140.79 mph
 2000 miles standing start: 137.25 mph
 50 kilometre standing start: 147.39 mph
 200 kilometre standing start: 145.89 mph
 500 kilometre standing start: 141.63 mph
 1000 kilometre standing start: 140.79 mph
 2000 kilometre standing start: 139.75 mph
 5000 kilometre standing start: 135.75 mph
 Flying five kilometres: 152.02 mph
 Average speed over one hour: 145.63 mph
 Average speed over three hours: 141.62 mph
 Average speed over six hours: 141.58 mph
 Average speed over 12 hours: 138.49 mph
 Average speed over 24 hours: 135.10 mph

S60 in motorsport

The S60 has been raced in a range of championships across Europe, North America and Australia.

Europe
Volvo regularly entered the S60 in the Swedish Touring Car Championship, where it finished 2nd in the drivers' championship twice and won the manufacturers' title once. The S60 continued to be raced after the formation of the Scandinavian Touring Car Championship, a merger of the Swedish and Danish touring car championships. Thed Björk won three consecutive titles from 2013 to 2015, and Rikard Göransson won the championship in 2016, driving an S60 prepared by Polestar Racing.

From 2002 to 2007 there was an S60 one-make racing series as a support series to the Swedish Touring Car Championship known as the S60 Challenge Cup, using 26 factory-modified S60s.

An S60 was driven by Robert Dahlgren in the Swedish round of the 2007 World Touring Car Championship.

In 2016 the S60 made its return to the WTCC with Fredrik Ekblom and Thed Björk driving for Polestar Cyan Racing. Their 2017 lineup consists of Thed Björk, Nestor Girolami and Nick Catsburg.

North America
The first generation S60 made its competitive debut in 2006, racing in the Speed World Challenge GT class. The second-generation model was introduced for the 2009 season. In 2010, its programme was expanded to include the SCAA Pro Racing World Challenge, where it won both the drivers' championship, for factory driver Randy Pobst, his fourth, and manufacturers' championships in the GT class. The programme was expanded again in 2011 to include the Pirelli World Challenge.

Australia
Volvo competed in the V8 Supercars Championship with two rear wheel drive V8 B8444S powered S60s between 2014 and 2016 with Garry Rogers Motorsport highlighted by a debut 2nd place at the Adelaide 500, a last second overtake to steal a race win at the Phillip Island Circuit, and third for Scott McLaughlin in the 2016 series driver standings.

Sales and marketing

† Combined total for S60 and V60.
‡ Includes 67 sales of the S60L long-wheelbase version.

See also
Volvo V70, estate car bearing the same design as the first generation

References

External links

 Volvo S60 - Official page
 IIHS Safety Test for Volvo S60
 Volvo S60 review and more 2016

S60
Euro NCAP large family cars
Compact executive cars
Motor vehicles manufactured in the United States
Sports sedans
Plug-in hybrid vehicles
Police vehicles
Touring cars
Front-wheel-drive vehicles
All-wheel-drive vehicles
Cars introduced in 2000
2010s cars